Archana Ravi (born 17 June 1996) is an Indian female model, beauty pageant holder, actress, classical dancer. In February 2019, she initiated a campaign called "Buddy Project" to empower children.

Career 
She started her career as a model and then went onto venture into film industry thereby making her Tamil cinema debut with the 2017 film Attu. After that she again entered into modelling and went to become a youth icon by participating at Global beauty pageant contests. She participated in Femina Miss India 2019 Kerala pageant and ended up as one of the Top 3 Miss India Kerala 2019 finalist. Later she became the Top 10 finalist of Miss Universe India 2020. In the year 2021, she is the official finalist for Glamanand Supermodel India for the 2021 edition which selects representatives for Miss International 2021 and Miss Multinational 2021. The finals will be held on upcoming August 23, 2021 and the talent round and preliminary competition will be held on August 20, 2021.

Filmography

References 

1996 births
Living people
Indian female models
Malayali people
People from Changanassery
Actresses in Tamil cinema
Beauty pageant contestants from India
Indian film actresses
21st-century Indian actresses
Female models from Kerala